Shamsabad is a village in Nasrabad Rural District, in the Central District of Taft County, Yazd Province, Iran. At the 2006 census, its population was 20, in 6 families.

References 

Populated places in Taft County